Unveiling the Wicked is the fourth studio album by Canadian speed metal band Exciter, released through Music for Nations in 1986 and reissued through Megaforce Records in 2005. Is the first album without the original guitarist John Ricci, replaced by Brian McPhee.

Track listing 
All songs written by Dan Beehler, Allan Johnson, and Brian McPhee.

Personnel

Exciter 
 Dan Beehler − vocals, drums
 Brian McPhee − guitar, backing vocals
 Allan Johnson – bass, backing vocals

Production 
Guy Bidmead – producer, engineer
Graham Meek – assistant engineer

References 

1986 albums
Exciter (band) albums
Music for Nations albums
Combat Records albums